Sheridan High School is a public high school located in Sheridan, Indiana in the northwestern part of Hamilton County.

Athletics
Sheridan is a perennial powerhouse in Indiana's Class 1A football, having been to and won nine state championships in their history including in 1980, 1984, 1987, 1988, 1992, 1998, 2005, 2006, and 2007 under coach Larry "Bud" Wright, Indiana Football Hall of Fame coach.

See also
 List of high schools in Indiana

References

External links
 Official Website

Public high schools in Indiana
Schools in Hamilton County, Indiana